Juho Karvonen (14 December 1888, Eno - 8 February 1966, Eno) was a Finnish logger and politician. He was a member of the Parliament of Finland from 1945 to 1962, representing the Social Democratic Party of Finland (SDP).

References

1888 births
1966 deaths
People from Joensuu
People from Kuopio Province (Grand Duchy of Finland)
Social Democratic Party of Finland politicians
Members of the Parliament of Finland (1945–48)
Members of the Parliament of Finland (1948–51)
Members of the Parliament of Finland (1951–54)
Members of the Parliament of Finland (1954–58)
Members of the Parliament of Finland (1958–62)
Finnish people of World War II